New Zealand competed at the 1992 Winter Olympics in Albertville, France.  Annelise Coberger won the nation's first medal (and the first medal by a competitor from the Southern Hemisphere) at the Winter Olympic Games in the women's slalom event.

Medalists

Competitors
The following is the list of number of competitors in the Games.

Alpine skiing

Short track speed skating

References

Official Olympic Reports
International Olympic Committee results database
 Olympic Winter Games 1992, full results by sports-reference.com

Nations at the 1992 Winter Olympics
1992
Winter Olympics